José Vicente Reynafé (1782–1837) was an Argentine military man and politician, who served as governor of Córdoba, Argentina between 1831 and 1835.

José Vicente Reynafé was born in Villa Tulumba, the son of William Queenfaith, born in Ireland, and Claudia Hidalgo de Torres, belonging to a Creole family. His father was a farmer, who had settled in Córdoba by the year 1770. He changed his surname Queenfaith to Reinafé. José Vicente Reinafé initiated and completed his education in Colegio Nacional de Monserrat. In the National University of Córdoba, he earned a degree in philosophy.

In 1837 José Vicente Reynafé, was sentenced to death by order of Juan Manuel de Rosas. He was accused, along with his brothers Francisco, Guillermo and José Antonio Reynafé, for the murder of Facundo Quiroga.

References

External links 
www.oni.escuelas.edu.ar

1782 births
1837 deaths
Argentine people of Irish descent
Argentine people of Spanish descent
Governors of Córdoba Province, Argentina